The canton of Saint-Just-en-Chaussée is an administrative division of the Oise department, northern France. Its borders were modified at the French canton reorganisation which came into effect in March 2015. Its seat is in Saint-Just-en-Chaussée.

It consists of the following communes:
 
Abbeville-Saint-Lucien
Airion
Angivillers
Ansauvillers
Auchy-la-Montagne
Avrechy
Bacouël
Beauvoir
Blancfossé
Bonneuil-les-Eaux
Bonvillers
Breteuil
Broyes
Brunvillers-la-Motte
Bucamps
Bulles
Campremy
Catheux
Catillon-Fumechon
Chepoix
Choqueuse-les-Bénards
Conteville
Cormeilles
Crèvecœur-le-Grand
Le Crocq
Croissy-sur-Celle
Cuignières
Doméliers
Erquinvillers
Esquennoy
Essuiles
Fléchy
Fontaine-Bonneleau
Fournival
Francastel
Froissy
Le Gallet
Gannes
Gouy-les-Groseillers
Hardivillers
La Hérelle
Lachaussée-du-Bois-d'Écu
Lieuvillers
Luchy
Maisoncelle-Tuilerie
Maulers
Le Mesnil-Saint-Firmin
Le Mesnil-sur-Bulles
Montreuil-sur-Brêche
Mory-Montcrux
Muidorge
La Neuville-Saint-Pierre
Noirémont
Noroy
Nourard-le-Franc
Noyers-Saint-Martin
Oursel-Maison
Paillart
Plainval
Plainville
Le Plessier-sur-Bulles
Le Plessier-sur-Saint-Just
Puits-la-Vallée
Le Quesnel-Aubry
Quinquempoix
Ravenel
Reuil-sur-Brêche
Rocquencourt
Rotangy
Rouvroy-les-Merles
Saint-André-Farivillers
Sainte-Eusoye
Saint-Just-en-Chaussée
Saint-Remy-en-l'Eau
Le Saulchoy
Sérévillers
Tartigny
Thieux
Troussencourt
Valescourt
Vendeuil-Caply
Viefvillers
Villers-Vicomte
Wavignies

References

Cantons of Oise